Luis Mercado can refer to:

Luis de Mercado (16th century), Spanish king Felipe II's chamber doctor, see Portrait of a Doctor
Luis Edgardo Mercado Jarrín (1919–2012), Peruvian politician and prime minister from 1973–1975
Luis Borrero Mercado (fl. 1929), Colombian politician and mayor of Bogotá
Luis Enrique Mercado (born 1952), Mexican journalist and politician
Luis Mercado (fl. 2005), Puerto Rican race walker; see 2005 Pan American Race Walking Cup
Luis Mercado (f'. 2010–2011), Honduran footballer in Honduran Liga Nacional
Luis Mercado, host of the web series To Catch a Cheater

See also 
Luis Gonzales (also Luis Mercado, 1928–2012), Filipino actor
Héctor Mercado (Héctor Luis Mercado, born 1974), Puerto Rican baseballer
Richard Mercado (Richard Luis Mercado Corozo, born 1986), Ecuadorian footballer